Enrique Colla was an Argentine football player. His position on the field was forward. Colla played for Boca Juniors and Independiente.

Playing career
He began his career playing for the Independiente, where he was top scorer in the 1912 season, where he scored 12 goals in dissident Federación Argentina de Football.

On 14 March 1915, Colla made his debut playing in Boca Juniors, he played until 1917 in the Xeneize team, playing several superclásicos against River Plate. Then he continued his career in San Lorenzo de Almagro and Argentino de Banfield.

There are ten known games that Colla played for Boca. The first was on January 7, 1917, and the last was on December 16, 1917. In his Boca career, he won one game, lost five, and tied four.

References 

Argentine footballers
Footballers from Buenos Aires
Boca Juniors footballers
Club Atlético Independiente footballers
Argentine people of Spanish descent
Year of birth missing
Río de la Plata
Association football forwards